Metrojet may refer to:

Airlines
MetroJet (American airline), a defunct American no-frills airline that operated as a division of US Airways
Metrojet (Russian airline), trading name of Kogalymavia, a Russian airline
Metrojet Ltd, a provider of business aviation services based in Hong Kong

Other
"Metro Jets" (song), a 1979 Nick Gilder song
Metro Jets, an American ice hockey team

See also
 MetJet, a defunct Wisconsin charter airline
 Metro (disambiguation)
 Jet (disambiguation)